Performance Rockin' the Fillmore is the 1971 live double-LP/single-CD by the English blues-rock group Humble Pie, recorded at the Fillmore East in New York City on May 28–29, 1971. It reached #21 on the Billboard 200, #32 in Canada, and entered the UK Top 40.

Background
The hour-long set contains one original song and several cover versions. "I Don't Need No Doctor" was the biggest hit from the album, having been issued as an edited single and reaching #73 on the Billboard Hot 100 in October 1971.

The song listed as "Four Day Creep", and attributed to the classic blues singer Ida Cox, bears no melodic or lyrical resemblance to her self-recorded composition of that title. The single version of "I Don't Need No Doctor" was backed with "A Song for Jenny" from the Rock On album, which Marriott wrote for his first wife, Jenny Rylance.

After the album was mixed, and shortly before it was released, guitarist Peter Frampton left the band because of growing friction between him and Marriott.

The album's steady sales helped it to become the band's first RIAA gold record. Its popularity helped the band's previous album, Rock On, reach gold album status.

On October 29, 2013, Omnivore Recordings released all four sets recorded that weekend as a four CD set Performance: Rockin' the Fillmore-Complete Recordings.

Track listing

Personnel
Humble Pie
Steve Marriott – guitar, vocals, harmonica
Peter Frampton – guitar, vocals
Greg Ridley – bass guitar, vocals
Jerry Shirley – drums

Technical team
Live recording by Fedco Audio Labs
Engineer: Eddie Kramer
Assistant engineer: David Palmer
Re-mixed at Electric Lady Studios, New York
Engineer: Eddie Kramer
Ably assisted by John Jansen, Andy Edlen, Buzzy and Tom
Produced by The Pie

Releases
1971 	LP 	A&M 3506
1990 	LP 	A&M 6008
1990 	CD 	A&M 75021-6008-2
1990  	CS 	A&M 75021-6008-4
1996 	CD 	Universal/Polygram 1887
2004 	LP 	Classic 3506
2006 	CD 	Universal 6229
2007 	CD 	Universal 93221
2007 	CD 	Universal 93221 (Japan)
2013   CD      Universal 3751304
2017 LP Box Disc 3 A&M ('The A&M Vinyl Boxset 1970-1975' released June 16, 2017)

References

External links
YouTube:/ "I Don't Need No Doctor" 1971
Steve Marriott - The Official Website
The History of Humble Pie

Humble Pie (band) albums
Live at the Fillmore East albums
A&M Records albums
1971 live albums
Albums produced by Steve Marriott
Albums produced by Peter Frampton
Albums produced by Greg Ridley
Albums produced by Jerry Shirley